Infantry Regiment 9 of Potsdam (I.R. 9) was an infantry regiment in Weimar Republic's Reichswehr and Nazi Germany's Wehrmacht, descended from famed 1st Prussian Regiment of Foot Guards in the German Empire's Deutsches Reichsheer.  
Garrisoned at the cradle of Prussian army and rich with tradition, it was nicknamed 'Count Nine' (Graf Neun) or 'I.R. von 9' by its detractors because of high percentage of Prussian aristocrats and purported arrogance in its ranks. 
 
Today it is most remembered for the fact that nineteen of its officers (or former officers) were involved in conspiracy against Hitler, more by far than any other German regiment.  Most of them were executed or committed suicide after the failure of the 20 July plot to assassinate Hitler.  Major General Henning von Tresckow and Lieutenant Colonel Fritz-Dietlof von der Schulenburg in particular were central figures in German resistance.

The regiment's tradition is continued by the Wachbataillon of the Bundeswehr.

Officers who conspired against Hitler 
Lieutenant Colonel Hasso von Boehmer 
Major Axel Freiherr von dem Bussche-Streithorst 
Captain Dr. Hans Fritzsche 
Lieutenant Colonel Helmuth von Gottberg 
Lieutenant Colonel Ludwig Freiherr von Hammerstein 
Lieutenant Colonel (res.) Carl-Hans Graf von Hardenberg 
Lieutenant General Paul von Hase 
Lieutenant Ewald Heinrich von Kleist 
Colonel Hans Otfried von Linstow 
Captain Friedrich Karl Klausing 
Major (res.) Ferdinand Freiherr von Lüninck 
Major (res.) Herbert Meyer 
Lieutenant Georg-Sigismund von Oppen 
Colonel Alexis Freiherr von Roenne 
Lieutenant Colonel (res.) Fritz-Dietlof von der Schulenburg
Lieutenant Colonel Gerd von Tresckow 
Major General Henning von Tresckow 
Lieutenant Colonel i. G. Hans-Alexander von Voß 
Captain (res.) Achim Freiherr von Willisen 
Colonel Claus von Stauffenberg  
Captain (res.) Richard von Weizsäcker

References 

Infantry regiments of Germany
Infantry units and formations of the Wehrmacht
Regiments of the German Army in World War II